Pavao Štalter (Karanac, 25 November 1929 – Zagreb, 5 October 2021) was a Croatian animator, director, screenwriter, scenographer and artist. He is known for his many animation shorts he produced at Zagreb Film.

Filmography
"Stvari" (1965, main artist)
"Veliki i mali manevri" (1966, main artist)
"Kutije" (1967, screenwriter, director, main artist)
"Maska crvene smrti" (1969, co-director, main artist, main animator)
"Scabies" (1970, co-director, main artist, co-animator)
"Duša" ( 1970, screenwriter, director, main artist)
"Mačka" ( 1971, main animator)
"Kubus" (1972, screenwriter, director, main animator)
"Konj" (1972, screenwriter, director, main animator)
"Love Story" (1973, main animator and co-director with Zlatko Bourek)
"Dolazak Slavena" (1975, main artist, main animator)
"Kulturna baština Hrvata - arhitektura" (1975, main artist, main animator)
"Kulturna baština Hrvata - kiparstvo" (1975, main artist, main animator)
"Feudalno društvo I." (1976, main artist, main animator)
"Feudalno društvo II." (1976, main artist, main animator)
"Sedam plamenčića" (1976, screenwriter, director, main artist, main animator)
"Medvjedić Bojan" (1975-1983, Children's cartoon, 15 episodes; main artist)
"Baltazar spotovi" (1973, screenwriter, director, main artist)
"Miš na Marsu" (1976-1979, Children's cartoon, 20 episodes; main artist)
"Baltazarov sat" (1979, screenwriter, main artist, director)
"Izgubljeni zec" (1979, screenwriter, main artist, director)
"Ptica" (1979, screenwriter, main artist, director)

Štalter worked as a scenographer for many other works, such as Inspektor Maska.

References

External links
Encyclopedic entry
Pavao Štadler at Proleksis enciklopedija
Pavao Štalter, Sve počinje crtežom - Kako se učilo kod prof. Ernesta T

Further reading
Who's who in Animated Cartoons: An International Guide to Film & Television by Jeff Lenburg

1929 births
2021 deaths
People from Osijek-Baranja County
Croatian animators
Croatian illustrators
Croatian directors
Croatian animated film directors